Spinilimosina is a genus of flies belonging to the family of the Lesser Dung flies.

Species
S. brevicostata (Duda, 1918)
S. pectinata (Tenorio, 1968)
S. rufifrons (Duda, 1925)
S. tetrasticha (Richards, 1973)

References

Sphaeroceridae
Sphaeroceroidea genera
Diptera of Africa
Diptera of Asia
Diptera of Australasia